Piruna ceracates is a butterfly in the family Hesperiidae. It is found in Mexico.

References

Butterflies described in 1874
Heteropterinae
Butterflies of North America
Taxa named by William Chapman Hewitson